Elkhorn North High School is a public high school located in Omaha, Nebraska. The school serves students in grades 9 through 12 and is one of three traditional high schools operated by Elkhorn Public Schools.

History
After targeting a parcel of land near 180th Street and West Maple Road for a potential third high school, Elkhorn Public Schools made three offers to buy the parcel from a development group, and when all were rejected, exercised eminent domain in 2017 in order to acquire the land. A successful mail-in referendum in March 2018 authorized EPS to build the third high school, which was expected to draw students mainly from Elkhorn High School. In September, school officials revealed a columbia blue, black and silver color scheme with a wolf mascot, chosen over eagles and nighthawks. Construction began the following month; at that time, the estimated cost was $78.5 million. Boundaries for the school were released in early 2019, confirming that the school would draw entirely from former Elkhorn territory.

The school opened for classes in fall 2020 with students in grades 9-11; that year's juniors will form the first senior class in the 2021–22 school year.

Facilities
The original Elkhorn North building was constructed to serve 1,200 students with an area of 254,000 square feet with the option to add a 600-student addition later on.

Academics
Elkhorn North offers dual enrollment classes through the University of Nebraska Omaha.

Athletics
ENHS athletic teams compete in the Eastern Midlands Conference.

References

External links

Elkhorn North High School - Sampson Construction

High schools in Omaha, Nebraska
Public high schools in Nebraska
2020 establishments in Nebraska
Educational institutions established in 2020